The 2007 Belmont Stakes was the 139th running of the Belmont Stakes. The race was held on June 9, 2007. Rags to Riches won the race by a head over Curlin before a crowd of 46,870, becoming the first filly to win the Belmont since 1905 and to win a Triple Crown race since the 1988 Kentucky Derby.

Full results

Belmont Stakes feature key prep races list
This list contains the current 2007 standings that leads to the Belmont Stakes race.

References

External links
ESPN report

2007
Belmont Stakes
Belmont Stakes
Belmont Stakes
Belmont Stakes